Zuber may refer to:

People 
 Zuber (surname)

Places 
 Zuber, Florida, United States
 Zuber Corners, Ontario, Canada

See also 
 Zuber & Cie, wallpaper manufacturer